Hay Green can refer to three villages in England:

Hay Green, Norfolk
Hay Green, Hertfordshire
Hay Green, Essex